Brachypalpus  cyanella , the Longnose Catkin, is a rare species of syrphid fly first officially described by Osten Sacken in 1877 Hoverflies get their names from the ability to remain nearly motionless while in flight. The adults are also known as flower flies, for they are commonly found around and on flowers from which they get both energy-giving nectar and protein-rich pollen. The larvae are of the rat-tailed type feeding on decaying sap under tree bark.

Distribution

This is a nearctic species distributed in the southern and central parts of California

External map

References

Eristalinae
Insects described in 1877
Diptera of North America

Hoverflies of North America
Taxa named by Carl Robert Osten-Sacken